Christa Laetitia Deeleman-Reinhold (born 23 November 1930) is a Dutch arachnologist. She specializes in spiders from Southeast Asia and Southern Europe, particularly cave-dwelling and tropical spiders. She donated a collection of about 25,000 Southeast Asian spiders, the largest collection of Southeast Asian spiders in existence, to the Naturalis Biodiversity Center in Leiden. In addition to numerous articles, she has written the book Forest Spiders of South East Asia (2001).

She born in 1930 to Dutch parents on the island of Java, Dutch East Indies. Her family returned to the Netherlands in 1935, and she entered Leiden University in 1949. after three years she began working at entered the Dutch National Museum of Natural History, studying mantises under museum director Hilbrand Boschma. She was married to businessman Paul Robert Deeleman, who accompanied her on multiple collecting expeditions to Yugoslavia and Southeast Asia. Her husband died in 1989, and she spent the next decade working on her mangum opus, Forest Spiders of South East Asia (2001), a nearly-600 page work in which she revised six spider families, describing 18 new genera and 115 new species. She continues to actively publish at the age of 90.

Taxa named for Deeleman-Reinhold 

Deelemania Jocqué & Bosmans, 1983
Deelemanella Yoshida, 2003
Deelemanikara Jäger, 2021
Troglohyphantes deelemanae Tanasevitch, 1987
Harpactea deelemanae Dunin, 1989
Kenocymbium deelemanae Millidge & Russell-Smith, 1992
Hersilia deelemanae Baehr & Baehr, 1993
Dianleucauge deelemanae Song & Zhu, 1994
Amaurobius deelemanae Thaler & Knoflach, 1995
Dubiaranea deelemanae Millidge, 1995
Cryphoecina deelemanae Deltshev, 1997
Deelemanella Yoshida, 2003
Molione christae Yoshida, 2003
Rhitymna deelemanae Jäger, 2003
Herennia deelemanae Kuntner, 2005
Spermophora deelemanae Huber, 2005
Dolichognatha deelemanae Smith, 2008

Selected publications 
Deeleman-Reinhold, 1971: "Beitrag zur Kenntnis höhlenbewohnender Dysderidae (Araneida) aus Jugoslawien." Razprave slovenska akademija znanosti in umetnosti, vol. 14 pp. 95–120.
Deeleman-Reinhold, 1974: "The cave spider fauna of Montenegro (Araneae)." Glasnik Republičkog Zavoda za zaštitu prirode i Prirodnjačkog Muzeja, vol. 6 pp. 9–33
Deeleman-Reinhold, 1978: "Revision of the cave-dwelling and related spiders of the genus Troglohyphantes Joseph (Linyphiidae), with special reference to the Yugoslav species." Academia Scientiarum et Artium Slovenica, Classis IV: Historia Naturalis, Institutum Biologicum Ionnis Hadži, Ljubljana, vol. 23 pp. 1–220. full text
Deeleman-Reinhold, 1980: "Contribution to the knowledge of the southeast Asian spiders of the families Pacullidae and Tetrablemmidae." Zoologische Mededelingen Leiden, vol. 56 pp. 65–82 (full text)
Deeleman-Reinhold, 1981: "Remarks on Origin and Distribution of Troglobitic Spiders". Proc. 8th Int. Congr. Speleology, blz. 305–308. (full text)
Deeleman-Reinhold & Prinsen, 1987: "Micropholcus fauroti (Simon) n. comb., a pantropical, synanthropic spider (Araneae: Pholcidae)." Entomologische Berichten, Amsterdam, vol. 47, pp. 73–77
Deeleman-Reinhold & Deeleman, 1988: "Révision des Dysderinae (Araneae, Dysderidae), les espèces mediterranéennes occidentales exceptées." Tijdschrift voor Entomologie, vol. 131 pp. 141–269
Deeleman-Reinhold, 1993: "A remarkable troglobitic tetrablemmid spider from a cave in Thailand (Arachnida: Araneae: Tetrablemmidae)." Natural History Bulletin of the Siam Society, vol. 41 n. 2 pp. 99–103
Deeleman-Reinhold, 1995: "The Ochyroceratidae of the Indo-Pacific region (Araneae)." The Raffles Bulletin of Zoology Supplement, n. 2, pp. 1–103
 Deeleman-Reinhold, 2001: Forest spiders of South East Asia: With a revision of the sac and ground spiders (Araneae: Clubionidae, Corinnidae, Liocranidae, Gnaphosidae, Prodidomidae and Trochanterriidae. Brill Academic Publishers, Leiden, pp. 1–591. 
 Floren, A. & Deeleman-Reinhold, C.L. (2005): "Diversity of arboreal spiders in primary and disturbed tropical forests." Journal of Arachnology, vol. 33 nr. 2, pp. 323–333.
Deeleman-Reinhold, 2009: "Spiny theridiids in the Asian tropics. Systematics, notes on behaviour and species richness (Araneae: Theridiidae: Chrysso, Meotipa)". Contrib. Nat. Hist., vol. 12, blz. 403–436. (full text)
Deeleman-Reinhold, 2009: "Description of the lynx spiders of a canopy fogging project in northern Borneo (Araneae: Oxyopidae), with description of a new genus and six new species of Hamataliwa." Zoologische Medelingen Leiden, vol. 83, pp. 673–700 (full text)

References 

Arachnologists
Dutch women scientists
Leiden University alumni
1930 births
Living people
20th-century Dutch biologists
Dutch zoologists
Dutch people of the Dutch East Indies
20th-century Dutch women